Peter Lai is a Hong Kong lyricist and actor.

In the 1970s and 1980s, he co-wrote many lyrics of the first Cantopop songs with Sam Hui. He also wrote songs for Anita Mui, Leslie Cheung and Alan Tam among other Hong Kong pop stars. Lai, along with Jim Wong, Jimmy Lo and Cheng Kwok Kong, are the pioneer generation of Cantopop lyricists in Hong Kong.

Lai has also worked as a screenwriter and film producer for Golden Harvest and TVB. Since the 1980s, he has acted in movies and TV series.

References

External links 

 
 

Hong Kong lyricists
Hong Kong actors
Living people
Year of birth missing (living people)